The mayor of Tagbilaran is the Local Chief Executive of the City of Tagbilaran, the capital city of the Province of Bohol in the Philippines.  The Mayor is in charge of the executive department of the city with the Vice Mayor taking charge of the legislative department. His powers are provided for and limited by R.A. 7160 or the Local Government Code of 1991.

List of chief executives

References

External links
 City Government of Tagbilaran

Tagbilaran
Tagbilaran